was a Japanese baseball pitcher.

He played and coached for the Yomiuri Giants and the Nippon Ham Fighters of Nippon Professional Baseball. 

He died of multiple organ failure in 2015 at the age of 69.

References

External links

1936 births
2015 deaths
Nippon Professional Baseball pitchers
Nippon Ham Fighters players
Yomiuri Giants players
Sportspeople from Hiroshima Prefecture
Deaths from multiple organ failure